Avi Pitusi is a former Israeli football (soccer) player who now works as a manager in Hapoel Ironi Rishon LeZion.
Pitusi started his career with Maccabi Tel Aviv, he played there for a few seasons before he moved on to play for Maccabi Petah Tikva and Hapoel Ironi Rishon LeZion.

He is of a Tunisian-Jewish descent.

Honours

As a Player
 Toto Cup
Winner (1): 1994–95

As a Manager
Liga Artzit
Runner-up (1): 2006-07

References

1971 births
Living people
Israeli Jews
Israeli footballers
Maccabi Tel Aviv F.C. players
Maccabi Petah Tikva F.C. players
Hapoel Rishon LeZion F.C. players
Israeli Premier League players
Liga Leumit players
Israeli football managers
Hapoel Ironi Rishon LeZion F.C. managers
Israeli people of Tunisian-Jewish descent
Association footballers not categorized by position